William Radhames Castro Checo (born March 29, 1952) is a Dominican former professional baseball pitcher and former pitching coach for the Milwaukee Brewers of both the American League and National League. He was the interim pitching coach with the Baltimore Orioles of the American League.  Gary Thorne of MASN reported in the broadcast of the August 27, 2013 game between the Orioles and the Boston Red Sox that Castro succeeded Rick Adair because Adair had taken a leave of absence for personal reasons starting in August 2013.  Gary Thorne, broadcasting the game between the Orioles and the Los Angeles Angels on July 5, 2012, on MASN, announced that Castro became unavailable for that game because of a death in his family and returned home to the Dominican Republic.

He played three more years with the New York Yankees and Kansas City Royals before retiring. He was traded from the Yankees to the California Angels for Butch Hobson during spring training on March 24, 1982. 

Late in the 2002 season, Castro also briefly served as pitching coach after the resignation of Dave Stewart. He then returned to his bullpen role until he was named pitching coach by new Milwaukee manager Ken Macha on November 7, 2008. The  season marked Castro's 18th consecutive season as a Brewer coach. Castro was subsequently fired as pitching coach on August 12, 2009, and replaced with former Brewer Chris Bosio.

Castro was the pitching coach for the Dominican Republic's entry in the inaugural World Baseball Classic.

References

External links

1953 births
Living people
Águilas Cibaeñas players
Columbus Clippers players
Danville Warriors players
Dominican Republic baseball coaches
Dominican Republic expatriate baseball players in Canada
Dominican Republic expatriate baseball players in the United States
Dominican Republic national baseball team people
Kansas City Royals players
Major League Baseball bullpen coaches
Major League Baseball pitchers
Major League Baseball pitching coaches
Major League Baseball players from the Dominican Republic
Milwaukee Brewers coaches
Milwaukee Brewers players
Newark Co-Pilots players
New York Yankees players
Sacramento Solons players
Vancouver Canadians players
Tacoma Tigers players